Musgrove is a surname. Notable people with the surname include:

Alexander J. Musgrove (1881–1952), Scottish-born Canadian artist
Armstrong Musgrove (1854 –1940), Canadian educator and politician
Bob Musgrove (1893–1941), English footballer
Grant Musgrove (born 1968), Australian policy advisor
George Musgrove (1854–1916), English-born Australian theatre producer
George Musgrove (politician) (1865–1954), Canadian dentist and politician
Grace Musgrove (born 1992), Australian triathlete
Harold Musgrove (born 1931), British businessman 
Hazel Musgrove (born 1989), British water-polo player
Harry Musgrove (1858–1931), Australian cricketer and theatrical manager
James Musgrove (1862–1935), British medical practitioner and educator
Joe Musgrove (born 1992), American baseball player
John Musgrove (disambiguation), multiple people
Sir John Musgrove, 1st Baronet (1793–1881), British businessman and Lord Mayor of London.
L. H. Musgrove (1832-1868), outlaw of the American West
Malcolm Musgrove (1933–2007), English football player and manager
Mary Musgrove (c. 1700–1763), Yamacraw and English cultural mediator in colonial America
Nick Musgrove (fl. 2010s), co-writer of Wrong Kind of Black
Ronnie Musgrove (born 1956), American politician
Spain Musgrove (born 1945), American football player 
Tom Musgrove (1927–1997), Canadian politician
Zane Musgrove (born 1996), New Zealand rugby league footballer

See also
Musgrave (surname)